Paloor may be:

M. N. Paloor, poet
Paloor people
Paloor language